Javone Prince is a British comedian and actor. He has appeared in many British comedy television shows, such as Horrible Histories, Sorry, I've Got No Head and Little Miss Jocelyn. He also Featured in The Dumping Ground as the character Lethal G. Prince is best known for starring as Jerwayne in PhoneShop.  Prince also appears in several theatre productions including, Measure for Measure, Titus Andronicus and Richard III. He trained at LAMDA and is currently a member of the National Theatre.

In July and August 2015, Prince's eponymous sketch show The Javone Prince Show was shown on BBC Two.

Filmography
Murder Prevention (1 episode, 2004) as Adam Yorke
Manderlay (2005) as Jack
According to Bex (1 episode, 2005) as Vox Pops
Mumbo Jumbo (2005) as Gool
The Judge (2005) as Afrikansk mand
The Tiger and the Snow (2005) as Soldato americano
Little Miss Jocelyn (3 episodes, 2006–2008)
The Verdict (5 episodes, 2007) as Damien Scott
Angelo's (3 episodes, 2007) as Mickey P
Tittybangbang (1 episode, 2007)
The Bill (1 episode, 2008) as Damon Watt
Horrible Histories (8 episodes, 2009) as Various
Comedy Showcase (1 episode, 2009) as Jerwayne
Rev. (1 episode, 2010) as Policeman Lloyd
Hotel Trubble (1 episode, 2010) as Z Dogg
PhoneShop (16 episodes, 2010–2013) as Jerwayne
Sorry, I've Got No Head (12 episodes, 2011) as Various, including Eddie Big & Olaff
My Family (3 episodes, 2002–2011) as Customer and Matt
At Home with Beyonce (2011) as Jay Z
Life's Too Short (2011) as Passer-by
Plebs (2013) as Bouncer
Quick Cuts (2 episodes, 2013)
The Javone Prince Show (2015) as himself (Nominated—British Academy Television Award for Best Male Comedy Performance)
Flat TV (5 episodes, 2014–2016) as Carl
Hank Zipzer as Mr Joy (2015–2016)
Hank Zipzer's Christmas Catastrophe as Mr Joy (2016)
The School that Got Teens Reading as presenter (2016) 
Find Me in Paris as Oscar (2018–present)
The Dumping Ground as Lethal G (2019)
No Time to Die - James Bond Movie A Counter Don
Dodger as PC Blathers (2022)

References

External links

 Javone Prince's United Agents Profile

Living people
Black British male actors
British male comedians
British male television actors
English people of Ghanaian descent
British male Shakespearean actors
Year of birth missing (living people)